Agripa Mbewe (born 30 January 1987) is a retired Zambian football striker.

References

1987 births
Living people
Zambian footballers
Zambia international footballers
Nchanga Rangers F.C. players
Nakambala Leopards F.C. players
National Assembly F.C. players
Red Arrows F.C. players
Association football forwards